The Philippines is an archipelago that comprises 7,641 islands with a total land area of . It is the world's fifth largest island country. The eleven largest islands contain 95% of the total land area.

The Philippine archipelago is divided into three Island groups: Luzon, the Visayas, and Mindanao. The Luzon islands include Luzon itself, Palawan, Mindoro, Marinduque, Masbate, Romblon, Catanduanes, Batanes, and Polillo. The Visayas is a group of islands in the central Philippines, the largest of which are: Panay, Negros, Cebu, Bohol, Leyte, Samar, Siquijor, Biliran, and Guimaras. The Mindanao islands include Mindanao itself, Dinagat, Siargao, Camiguin, Samal, plus the Sulu Archipelago, composed primarily of Basilan, Sulu, and Tawi-Tawi.

The Philippines lies between 4°23' and 21° North (N) latitude and between 116° and 127° East (E) longitude.

Physical geography

The Philippine archipelago lies in Southeast Asia, and numbers some 7,641 islands. This makes it the fifth largest island country in the world. They, together with the cluster of islands in Visayas in between them, represent the three principal regions of the archipelago that are identified by the three stars on the Philippine flag. The Philippines is broken up in many islands by the sea. It is located between 116° 40', and 126° 34' E longitude and 4° 40' and 21° 10' N latitude and is bordered by the Philippine Sea to the east, the South China Sea to the west, and the Celebes Sea to the south. The island of Borneo is located a few hundred kilometers southwest and Taiwan is located directly to the north. The Moluccas and Sulawesi are located to the south-southwest and Palau is located to the east of the islands.

The Philippines is part of a western Pacific arc system characterized by active volcanoes. Among the most notable peaks are Mount Mayon near Legazpi City, Taal Volcano south of Manila, and Mount Apo in Mindanao. All of the Philippine islands are prone to earthquakes. The rain forests also offer prime habitat for more than 500 species of birds, including the Philippine eagle (or monkey-eating eagle), some 1,100 species of orchids, and some 8,500 species of flowering plants.

Manila Bay, upon the shore of which the capital city of Manila lies, is connected to Laguna de Bay, the largest lake in the Philippines, by the Pasig River. Subic Bay, Davao Gulf, and the Moro Gulf are other important bays. The San Juanico Strait separates the islands of Samar and Leyte but it is traversed by the San Juanico Bridge. The Puerto Princesa Subterranean River, which runs  underground through a karst landscape before reaching the ocean, is a UNESCO World Heritage Site.

Other extensive river systems are the Pulangi River, which flows into the Mindanao River (Rio Grande de Mindanao); the Agusan, in Mindanao which flows north into the Mindanao Sea; and the Pampanga, which flows south from east Central Luzon into Manila Bay. Several rivers have been harnessed for hydroelectric power.

To protect the country's biological resources, the government has taken a first step of preparing a Biodiversity Action Plan to address conservation of threatened species.

Most of the islands used to be covered by tropical rainforests. However, illegal logging has reduced forest cover to less than 10% of the total land area.

Geology

The Philippine Archipelago is geologically part of the Philippine Mobile Belt located between the Philippine Sea Plate, the South China Sea Basin of the Eurasian Plate, and the Sunda Plate. The Philippine Trench (also called the Mindanao Trench) is a submarine trench  in length found directly east of the Philippine Mobile Belt and is the result of a collision of tectonic plates. The Philippine Fault System consists of a series of seismic faults that produce several earthquakes per year, most of which are not felt. The Galathea Depth in the Philippine Trench is the deepest point in the country and the third deepest in the world. The trench is located in the Philippine Sea.

The islands are composed of volcanic, coral, principal rock formations. Eight major types of forests are distributed throughout the Philippines; dipterocarp, beach forest, pine forest, molave forest, lower montane forest, upper montane or mossy forest, mangroves, and ultrabasic forest. The highest mountain is Mount Apo.

Situated on the western fringes of the Pacific Ring of Fire, the Philippines experiences frequent seismic and volcanic activity. The Benham Plateau to the east in the Philippine Sea is an undersea region active in tectonic subduction. Around 20 earthquakes are registered daily, though most are too weak to be felt. The last major earthquake was the 1990 Luzon earthquake. There are many active volcanoes such as the Mayon Volcano, Mount Pinatubo, and Taal Volcano. The eruption of Mount Pinatubo in June 1991 produced the second largest terrestrial eruption of the 20th century. The Philippines is the world's second-biggest geothermal energy producer behind the United States, with 18% of the country's electricity needs being met by geothermal power.

Mount Pinatubo is notorious for its destructive  eruption on June 15, 1991. Taal Volcano, one of the Decade Volcanoes, had a  eruption on January 12, 2020. Mount Mayon is renowned for having an almost perfect cone, but has a violent history of 47 eruptions since 1616 and its  eruption on June 23, 1897, rained fire for seven days.

Significant mineral deposits exist as a result of the country's complex geologic structure and high level of seismic activity. These deposites are considered highly valuable. The country is thought to have the second-largest gold deposits after South Africa, along with a large amount of copper deposits. Palladium, originally discovered in South America, was found to have the world's largest deposits in the Philippines too. Romblon island is a source of high-quality marble. Other minerals include chromite, nickel, and zinc. Despite this, a lack of law enforcement, poor management, opposition due to the presence of indigenous communities, and past instances of environmental damages and disasters, have resulted in these mineral resources remaining largely untapped.

Topography

Luzon

The Batanes and Babuyan islands 
The Batanes and Babuyan Islands are situated on the northernmost extremity of the Philippines at Luzon Strait facing Taiwan. It contains the northernmost point of land, the islet of Y'Ami in the Batanes Islands, separated from Taiwan by the Bashi Channel (c. wide).

Western Luzon 
This region stretches from Mairaira Point in Pagudpud, Ilocos Norte in the north to Cochinos Point in Mariveles, Bataan in the south. The terrain ranges from coastal plains to rugged mountains bordered by the South China Sea in the west and the Cordillera Central and Zambales mountain ranges in the east. Western Luzon is known for its beaches, surf spots and historic towns.

Cagayan Valley 
Nestled between the Cordilleras in the west and the Sierra Madre mountain ranges in the east is the Cagayan Valley, also the name of the administrative region which it covers. Through its center runs the country's longest river, the Cagayan, flowing in a northward direction before emptying its waters in the Luzon Strait at the town of Aparri.

Cordilleras and Caraballos 
The Cordilleras and Caraballos, together with the Sierra Madre Range, form the main mountain system in Northern Luzon.

The Cordilleras consists of two, sometimes three, mountain ranges that are found in northwestern central Luzon. The first, called Caraballo del Sur, forms the nucleus of the system and has its highest peaks in the border between the provinces of Abra, Ilocos Norte and Cagayan. Caraballo Occidentalles, is further divided into two ranges, the Cordillera Norte and Cordillera Central. They line the central portions of the Cordillera Administrative Region.

The Caraballos (Caraballo de Baler) start where the Sierra Madre and the Cordilleras meet. They are found south of Cagayan Valley, northeast of the Central Luzon Plains.

Sierra Madre Mountains 
Lying in the eastern portion of Luzon is the longest mountain range in the Philippines, the Sierra Madre, stretching from Quezon province in the south to Cagayan in the north. 80 percent of the mountain range is tropical rainforest, which is diminishing from rampant illegal logging activity. The range serves as the eastern wall of Luzon Island that protects inhabitants from tropical cyclones usually coming from the Pacific Ocean.

Central Luzon Plains 
The largest plain of the nation is situated in the Central Luzon region and produces most of the national rice supply, earning itself the nickname "Rice Bowl of the Philippines". The plains encompass the provinces of Bulacan, Nueva Ecija, Pampanga, Tarlac and Pangasinan.

Manila-Katagalugan plains 
South of the Central Luzon plains lies the largest inland freshwater lake in Southeast Asia, Laguna de Bay. To the east of the lake is a plain that stretches westward to Manila Bay. Large rivers from bays and mountain springs traverse the plain. In the northern part of the region, that is, Manila and Rizal, most of the plain had been converted into cities and towns, and are thus industrialized. Lying east of the lake is the southern terminus of the Sierra Madre mountain range at northern Quezon province.

To the southwest of Laguna de Bay is the nation's third largest lake, the Taal, bordered to the north by the Tagaytay Ridge, a ridge stretching from southern Cavite to northern Batangas provinces.

Bondoc Peninsula 
The Bondoc Peninsula is located in the southeastern part of Quezon Province.

Bicol Peninsula 
Southeast of Laguna de Bay lies the Bicol Peninsula, connected to mainland Luzon by the isthmus of Tayabas. The predominantly flat landscape features several solitary peaks, usually active volcanoes, which include Iriga, Mayon and Bulusan.

The peninsula has an irregular coastline that features large bays and gulfs, which include the Lamon Bay, San Miguel Bay, Lagonoy Gulf, and Albay Gulf to the north, and the Tayabas Bay, Ragay Gulf and Sorsogon Bay to the south.

Mindoro Island

Mindoro coastal plains 
Mindoro's coastal plains are characterized by rice and corn fields, rivers, beaches, and extensive open space areas. Most of the population is concentrated on the northern and eastern coast of this island where the city of Calapan and Puerto Galera are located.

Mindoro highlands 
The Mindoro mountain range begins with Mount Halcon and is further divided into three. The northwest ends at Calavite Point and is a landmark for ships. The east originates from Lake Naujan and the west follows the Mindoro Strait.

Palawan

Kalayaan islands (Spratly Islands) 
The Kalayaan Islands are located to the west of Palawan. Kalayaan is a Filipino word meaning "freedom".

Visayas

Panay-Negros-Cebu Area

Panay is the third largest island in the Philippines, behind Mindanao and Luzon. Negros is home to the Canlaon Volcano, one of the active volcanoes in the Philippines. Cebu is a long and narrow island and is the 126th largest island in the world. Other islands nearby are: Guimaras, Boracay, Camotes Islands, Bantayan Island, Mactan and Olangapo Islands and Bohol.

Mindanao

Eastern Pacific Cordillera 
The eastern coast of Mindanao features a long mountain range, the Eastern Pacific Cordillera, which stretches from Bilar Point at Surigao in the north to Cape San Agustin at Davao in the south. Forming its northern portion are the Diwata Mountains (also spelled Diuata), separated from the south by low passes situated at the middle. To the east of the range are narrow strips of lowland that feature several inlets and bays, the most prominent of which include the Lianga and Bislig bays.

Davao-Agusan Trough 
To the west  of the Pacific Cordillera lies an extensive lowland, the Davao-Agusan Trough. Its northern portion includes the Agusan Valley which forms the lower river basin of the Agusan River. The river flows in a northward direction and empties into the Butuan Bay. Draining the southern portion of the lowland are several other rivers, which include the Tagum, flowing southward to Davao Gulf.

Central Mindanao highlands 
Situated west of the Davao-Agusan Trough is a complex series of mountain ranges called the Central Mindanao Highlands (also known as the Central Cordillera). From these mountains form the headwaters of several rivers which include the Rio Grande de Mindanao, Pulangi, Maridagao and Tagoloan rivers. Several tall mountains, such as Mount Apo, the country's highest are found within the range.

Bukidnon-Lanao plateaus 
The north-central portion of Mindanao is dominated by an extensive highland region, the Bukidnon-Lanao Plateau, which includes the Kitanglad and Kalatungan mountain ranges. Within the plateau lies the country's second largest lake, Lake Lanao situated at an elevation of 2,296 feet, drained by the Agus River flowing northward to its river mouth at Iligan Bay.

Cotabato Basin 
South of the Bukidnon-Lanao Plateau lies a large depression, the Cotabato Basin, which forms the lower river basin of the country's second largest river system, the Rio Grande de Cagayan (also known as the Mindanao River). Surrounded by three mountain ranges, the basin's only opening to the sea is to the northwest at Illana Bay, where the Mindanao River empties into the ocean.

To the southeast of the main basin are two large valleys, the Koronadal and Allah valleys.

Tiruray highlands 
Situated south and west of the Cotabato Basin are a moderately high mountain range, the Tiruray Highlands, which block off the Basin from the southern coastline. South of the highlands are narrow strips of coastlines.

Zamboanga peninsula 
At the northwestern tip of Mindanao is the generally mountainous Zamboanga Peninsula.

The southern coastline is irregular, featuring two smaller peninsulas, the Sibuguey and Baganian, extending southward to the Moro Gulf.

Outlying islands of Mindanao

Dinagat and Siargao Islands 
To the north of the Diwata Mountains at northeast Mindanao lie Siargao island and the Dinagat group of islands.

Sulu Archipelago 
Southwest of the Zamboanga Peninsula is the Sulu Archipelago, a chain of islands which comprise the smaller archipelago provinces of Basilan, Sulu, and Tawi-Tawi.

Administrative geography

The Philippines is divided into a hierarchy of local government units (LGUs) with the 81 provinces and 38 independent cities as the primary unit. Provinces are further subdivided into component cities and municipalities, both of which consist of barangays, the smallest local government unit.

Regions
There are 17 regions comprising the Philippines. Each region, with the exception of the National Capital Region, is further subdivided into component provinces. The National Capital Region is divided into four special districts.

Most government offices establish regional offices in a city to serve the constituent provinces. Such cities are designated as "regional centers". The regions themselves do not possess a separate local government, with the exception of the Bangsamoro Autonomous Region.

Provinces
Forming the regions, with the exception of the National Capital, are the 81 provinces. Each province has a capital city or municipality.

Landlocked and island provinces
Of the 82 provinces of the Philippines, 16 are landlocked, and 16 are island provinces.

Climate

The Philippines has a tropical maritime climate that is usually hot and humid. There are three seasons: tag-init or tag-araw, the hot dry season or summer from March to May; tag-ulan, the rainy season from June to November; and tag-lamig, the cool dry season from December to February. The southwest monsoon (from May to October) is known as the Habagat, and the dry winds of the northeast monsoon (from November to April), the Amihan. The coolest month is January; the warmest is May. Some locations have no dry season (meaning, all months have an average rainfall of above ) and certain higher-altitude areas can have a subtropical climate. Manila and most of the lowland areas are hot and dusty from March to May. Even at this time, however, temperatures rarely rise above . Mean annual sea-level temperatures rarely fall below .

In considering temperature, location in terms of latitude and longitude is not a significant factor. Whether in the extreme north, south, east, or west of the country, temperatures at sea level tend to be in the same range. Altitude usually has more of an impact. Monsoon rains, although hard and drenching, are not normally associated with high winds and waves. But the Philippines sit astride the typhoon belt, and it suffers an annual onslaught of dangerous storms from July through October. These are especially hazardous for northern and eastern Luzon and the Bicol and Eastern Visayas regions, but Manila gets devastated periodically as well.

In the last decade, the Philippines has been hit severely by natural disasters. In 2005 alone, Central Luzon was hit by both a drought, which sharply curtailed hydroelectric power, and by a typhoon that flooded practically all of low-lying Manila's streets. Still more damaging was the 1990 earthquake that devastated a wide area in Luzon, including Baguio and other northern areas. The city of Cebu and nearby areas were struck by a typhoon that killed more than a hundred people, sank vessels, destroyed part of the sugar crop, and cut off water and electricity for several days. The Philippines is prone to about six to nine storms which make landfall each year, on average. The 1991 Mount Pinatubo eruption also damaged much of Central Luzon, the lahar burying towns and farmland, and the ashes affecting global temperatures.

Sitting astride the typhoon belt, the islands experience 15-20 typhoons annually from July to October, with around nineteen typhoons entering the Philippine area of responsibility in a typical year and eight or nine making landfall. Historically typhoons were sometimes referred to as baguios. The wettest recorded typhoon to hit the Philippines dropped  in Baguio from July 14 to 18, 1911. The Philippines is highly exposed to climate change and is among the world's ten countries that are most vulnerable to climate change risks.

Building construction is undertaken with natural disasters in mind. Most rural housing has consisted of nipa huts that are easily damaged but are inexpensive and easy to replace. Most urban buildings are steel and concrete structures designed (not always successfully) to resist both typhoons and earthquakes. Damage is still significant, however, and many people are displaced each year by typhoons, earthquakes, and other natural disasters. In 1987 alone the Department of Social Welfare and Development helped 2.4 million victims of natural disasters.

Statistics

CIA Statistics
Unless otherwise indicated, the information below is taken from CIA Factbook information for the Philippines.

Area
 Total: 
 Land: 
 Water:

Coastline

Maritime claims 
(measured from claimed archipelagic baselines)
 Continental shelf: to depth of exploitation
 Exclusive economic zone:  with 

Natural resources
 Timber, petroleum, nickel, cobalt, silver, gold, salt, and copper.

Land use
 Arable land: 20%
 Permanent crops: 16.67%
 Other: 64.33% (2005)

Irrigated land
  (2003)

Natural hazards
The Philippines sit astride typhoon belt and are usually affected by 15 and struck by five to six cyclonic storms per year; landslides; active volcanoes; destructive earthquakes; tsunamis.

Environment - current issues

Uncontrolled deforestation in watershed areas; soil erosion; air and water pollution in Manila; increasing pollution of coastal mangrove swamps which are important fish breeding grounds; severe water pollution that caused the death of one of the country's major rivers, though there are ongoing efforts at resuscitation.

Typhoon Haiyan in November 2013 caused major problems.

Environment - international agreements
Party to: Biodiversity, Climate Change, Endangered Species, Hazardous Wastes, Law of the Sea, Marine Dumping, Nuclear Test Ban, Ozone Layer Protection, Tropical Timber 83, Tropical Timber 94, Wetlands, Whaling
Signed, but not ratified: Climate Change-Kyoto Protocol, Desertification

Subnational enclaves and exclaves
In political geography, an enclave is a territory or part of a territory lying wholly within the boundaries of another, and an exclave is one which is politically attached to a larger piece but not actually contiguous with it. Many entities are both enclaves and exclaves, but the two are not synonymous.

Exclaves and enclaves
 Caloocan is divided in two by Valenzuela City and Quezon City.
 In Cotabato province, the municipality of President Roxas is divided in two by Antipas municipality.
 Manila South Cemetery is an exclave of the district of San Andres, located in the capital city of Manila. It is divided and surrounded by Makati.

Pene-enclaves/exclaves and inaccessible districts
 In Soccsksargen:
 Sarangani province is separated into two sections by General Santos and Sarangani Bay.
 In the Zamboanga Peninsula:
 Isabela City, the provincial capital of Basilan province (part of the Bangsamoro Autonomous Region) is part of Zamboanga Peninsula despite it being separated from it by the Basilan Strait.
 Zamboanga City, a highly urbanized independent city, is statistically part of Zamboanga del Sur province, but is separated from it by Zamboanga Sibugay province.

Subnational quadripoint
A quadripoint is a point on the Earth that touches four distinct regions. Such points are often called "four corners", from the corners of the four regions meeting there.
 Four provinces in Mindanao meet at a point at the summit of Mount Apo: Bukidnon of Northern Mindanao Region, Davao del Norte and Davao del Sur of Davao Region, and Cotabato Province of Soccsksargen

More than four
Four distinct geographic divisions converging at a single point is not uncommon in the Philippines, and there are other points of convergence between five or more divisions that can be found.

Geographic center

The island province of Marinduque prides itself as being the geographic center of the Philippines. The Marinduque governor has stated that their claim to be the Geographical Center of the Philippines has received notice and support from the National Mapping and Resource Information Authority (NAMRIA). The Luzon Datum of 1911 in Marinduque is used as point number one for all map makers in the country.

The boundaries of the Philippine archipelago are described in Article III of the Treaty of Paris (1898), as comprising an irregular polygon. A box enclosing that polygon would have corners at 20°N 116°E, 20°N 127°E, 4.75°N 127°E, 4.75°N 116°E. The center of this box would lie at 121.5 E, 12.375 N. That point lies roughly in the center of the Tablas Strait between the islands of Tablas and Mindoro.

Republic Act No. 9522, "An Act to Define the Baselines of the Territorial Sea of the Philippines", describes an irregular polygon which fits within a box with its center at 121°44'47.45"E 12°46'6.1252"N, a point also roughly in the center of the Tablas Strait.

The CIA Factbook locates the Philippines at 13°N 122°E.

The extreme points under Philippine control  are:

The center of a box enclosing these points would be located at 12°46’6.13"N, 120°26’36.46"E. That point is located in the Mindoro Strait, about  NNE of Apo Island, in Sablayan, Occidental Mindoro.

See also

 Island groups of the Philippines
 List of islands of the Philippines
 List of headlands of the Philippines
 List of mountains in the Philippines
 List of Ultras of the Philippines
 List of volcanoes in the Philippines
 List of active volcanoes in the Philippines
 List of potentially active volcanoes in the Philippines
 List of inactive volcanoes in the Philippines
 List of bays of the Philippines
 List of lakes of the Philippines
 List of rivers of the Philippines
 Extreme points of the Philippines
 Territories claimed by the Philippines
 Borders of the Philippines
 Subduction tectonics of the Philippines

References

External links
 Government Portal of the Republic of the Philippines 
 An act to amend section one of republic act numbered thirty hundred and forty-six, entitled "An act to define the baselines of the territorial sea of the Philippines"

Further reading